Mohammed Ismail Sherif Kwaku Frimpong (born 9 January 2002), professionally known as Black Sherif, is a Ghanaian singer and rapper. He initially gained popularity in 2021 with his song "First Sermon," which he released in May. This was followed up with the "Second Sermon" in July.

His breakthrough came in March 2022 with his hit single "Kwaku the Traveller," which reached number 1 on the Ghanaian and Nigerian Apple Music charts. He then released his debut album, The Villain I Never Was, on October 5, 2022.

Early life and education 
Black Sherif was born and raised in Konongo-Zongo, in the Ashanti Region of Ghana.  As both his parents stayed overseas, Black Sherif lived with his aunt and other extended family members at the age of 10. His nomadic lifestyle exposed him to multiple influences and different cultures at a very early age.

He attended his basic education at Konongo Zongo Islamic Basic School and later at Pinamang Educational Complex, where he graduated junior high school (J.H.S). He then later completed his secondary education at Kumasi Academy, where he picked up an interest in music and dancing.

He is a former student of the University of Professional Studies (UPSA) and is currently studying at the University of Ghana.

Career 
Black Sherif began his career in 2019 with the release of his song "Cry for Me" on YouTube. His debut single "Money" was released on May 25, 2020, along with a music video. In May 2021, his single "First Sermon" was released, further increasing his audience. The song's sequel, "Second Sermon," was released in July and received a remix with fellow African artist Burna Boy.

His breakthrough came in March 2022 with his single "Kwaku the Traveller," which reached number 1 on the Ghanaian and Nigerian Apple Music charts and became his most popular song. He released his debut album, The Villain I Never Was, in October, supported by the singles "45" and "Soja". 

Black Sherif performed at the 25th anniversary of the Music of Black Origin (MOBO) Awards, which took place at the OVO Arena in Wembley, UK. In December 2022, Black Sherif hosted his debut concert, the "Mozama Disco Concert" in Accra. 

On 20 February 2023, Black Sherif won the Best Hip Hop award at the Soundcity MVP Awards, which were held at the Eko Convention Center in Lagos.

Artistry 
Black Sherif's music is a blend of highlife, reggae, and hip-hop, specifically UK drill. He has stated his musical influences are rappers Kanye West, Travis Scott, Saint Jhn, Dave, Stormzy, J Hus, and Ghanaian artists Mugeez and Sarkodie.

Controversies 
On 11 April 2022, a lawsuit was filed against Black Sherif for alleged breach of contract after Sherif signed a deal with Empire Shadrach Agyei Owusu, the CEO of Waynes Chavis Consult, was seeking the court to restrict Black Sherif from performing at events without his authorization. Fortunately for Black Sherif, the Accra High Court (Commercial Division) dismissed the injunction filed against him which sought to prevent the singer from performing music he released under his old management.

Discography 
Albums
 The Villain I Never Was (2022)

Awards and nominations

References

External links 
 Official Instagram Profile
 All new updates from Black Sherif

Ghanaian rappers
Living people
2002 births
Kumasi Academy alumni